DNA-directed RNA polymerase II subunit RPB1, also known as RPB1, is an enzyme that in humans is encoded by the POLR2A gene.

Function 

This gene encodes the largest subunit of RNA polymerase II, the polymerase responsible for synthesizing messenger RNA in eukaryotes. The product of this gene contains a carboxy terminal domain composed of heptapeptide repeats that are essential for polymerase activity. These repeats contain serine and threonine residues that are phosphorylated in actively transcribing RNA polymerase. In addition, this subunit, in combination with several other polymerase subunits, forms the DNA-binding domain of the polymerase, a groove in which the DNA template is transcribed into RNA.

Interactions
POLR2A has been shown to interact with:

 BRCA1, 
 CREBBP, 
 CTDP1, 
 CDK8, 
 GTF2B, 
 GTF2F1, 
 GTF2H4, 
 MED21, 
 MED26, 
 PCAF, 
 POLR2C, 
 POLR2E, 
 POLR2H, 
 POLR2L, 
 PQBP1, 
 SMARCA2, 
 SMARCA4 
 SMARCB1, 
 SMYD3, 
 SND1, 
 SUPT5H, 
 TAF11,
 TBP, 
 TCEA1, 
 TCERG1,  and
 ZNF74.

References

Further reading